Borghild Holmsen (22 October 1865 – 4 December 1938) was a Norwegian pianist, music critic and composer.

Borghild Holmsen was born in  Kråkstad (now Ski), Akershus, Norway. When she was 7 years old, her family settled in Christiania (now Oslo). She studied piano with Agathe Backer-Grøndahl and Otto Winter-Hjelm, and continued her studies with Carl Reinecke and Salomon Jadassohn in Leipzig and Albert Becker in Berlin.

She made her debut in 1890 in Christiania, afterward touring as a concert pianist in Europe and the United States. After ending her concert career, she became a teacher at the Bergen Music Conservatory, where Harald Sæverud was one of her pupils. She wrote as a music critic for the newspapers,  Bergens Aftenblad and Bergens Arbeiderblad.

Works
Selected works include:
Violin Sonata, Op. 10
Barcarolle, Op.1, No. 1
Scherzo, Op. 1, No. 2

References

External links

1865 births
1938 deaths
19th-century classical composers
20th-century classical composers
Women classical composers
Norwegian classical composers
Norwegian classical pianists
Norwegian music critics
Norwegian women composers
Norwegian women critics
Norwegian women non-fiction writers
Norwegian music educators
People from Akershus
19th-century Norwegian composers
Women music educators
20th-century women composers
19th-century women composers
People from Ski, Norway
20th-century Norwegian women
19th-century women pianists
20th-century women pianists